Aaron Kirman is a Los Angeles-based real estate agent and investor who appears regularly on CNBC's Secret Lives of the Super Rich and stars on CNBC's real estate reality series Listing Impossible.
 
In 2018, he was named the fifth highest producing agent in the nation by individual volume according to REAL Trends; in 2019, it named his real estate team No. 10 in the country by volume and the largest in Los Angeles. Kirman averages $300 million to $400 million in home sales, has roughly $6 billion in lifetime home sales and is president of Aaroe Estates, the luxury property division of the John Aaroe Group. Kirman has represented Rihanna, Nicki Minaj, Orlando Bloom and royal families from Saudi Arabia, Qatar, and Kuwait in real estate transactions. In 2018, the John Aaroe Group, with International and Partners Trust were rebranded as Pacific Union International (acquired by real estate technology company Compass); Kirman was named president of Pacific Union Luxury Estates Division and is currently named Compass' president of international estates.

In addition, Kirman is known for his high-profile estate listings, such as the Danny Thomas estate (which sold for $65 million, the second largest sale in the history of Beverly Hills). Kirman has also represented several historic houses in their sale, including the Case Study 21 house (designed by Pierre Koenig), Frank Lloyd Wright's Ennis House, as well as houses designed by Richard Neutra, Frank Gehry, Paul Williams, Oscar Niemeyer, Rudolph Schindler and John Lautner. In 2018 his listings also included The Beverly House, a Beverly Hills mansion formerly owned by William Randolph Hearst, and used as locations in the horse head scene of The Godfather as well as The Bodyguard, the Edie Goetz Estate, the Eddie Thomas House and The Mountain Beverly Hills, an undeveloped 157-acre hilltop property formerly owned by Shams Pahlavi, Merv Griffin and Mark R. Hughes and reported to be Los Angeles' most expensive property listing at $1 billion by the Los Angeles Times, Fortune magazine and others.

Early life and career
Kirman grew up in Encino, California. His father was in trucking and his mother was a teacher. As a child he suffered from learning disabilities, including dyslexia, and a speech impediment that hampered his ability to say the letter R. Kirman says he dreaded the first day of school each year, describing it as "horrible".

Though Kirman's learning disabilities initially prevented him from attending the University of Southern California, a letter he wrote detailing his situation and his desire to attend the university won him an interview and admittance. Kirman graduated with a degree in business and communications.

At age 19, while in college at the University of Southern California, Kirman began doing his first real estate deals. He attributes his initial success to luck, as he did not come from a privileged background.
 
Since then, Kirman was executive director of the architectural division at real estate brokerage, Hilton & Hyland, then moved on to his position at the John Aaroe Group. As of 2018, he is president of Pacific Union Luxury Estates Division. In 2019 he was named Compass' president of international estates and added properties in Orange County, Northern California and Italy to his listings.

Kirman also stars in the CNBC reality show, Listing Impossible. The program centers around Kirman and his associates selling multi-million dollar homes and estates.

References

Living people
American real estate brokers
Businesspeople from Los Angeles
University of Southern California alumni
LGBT people from California
People from Encino, Los Angeles
Year of birth missing (living people)
21st-century LGBT people